Ryan Nagode is an automobile stylist and currently the chief designer for RAM/SRT Interior Studio at Stellantis. In 2014, Nagode was named to the  Automotive News "40 under 40."

A graduate of the Cleveland Institute of Art Industrial Design Program in 2003, Nagode designed the exterior of the Dodge Avenger;  the Dodge Journey; the interior of the 2009 Dodge Ram and 2011 Jeep Wrangler; and directed the design studio for the 2013 RAM 1500/2500/3500 interiors, including the Laramie Longhorn and Limited models, as well as the 2013 Dodge Dart and the return of the 2013 SRT Viper.

In a 2007 interview, Nagode said the front end of the Avenger was inspired by a fond pair of the designer's Oakley sunglasses  and the feeling they give him when he wore them.'''

Background
Nagode is the son of Larry and Denise Nagode, grew up in East Aurora, NY and graduated in 1998 from East Aurora High School. Nagode's father was also a graduate of the Cleveland Institute of Art in 1974, and was a student of Viktor Schreckengost and is Senior Designer at Fisher-Price — where Ryan Nagode had also served a summer internship.

Nagode participated in the CIA's 5th annual Automotive Design Symposium, March 2, 2007 at the Cleveland Auto Show as well as the Cleveland Institute of Art's Future center for design and technology transfer, Design Values 2, June 1 through August 3, 2007.

Gallery
The second generation Dodge Avenger, 2009 Dodge Journey, as well as the 2009 Dodge Ram Interior, styled by Ryan Nagode:

References

External links
Video: Ryan Nagode comments on the 2008 Dodge Avenger
Video: Ryan Nagode, Design Chief, 2008 Dodge Avenger
Video: LA Auto Show: Chrysler Designer Ryan Nagode and the Dodge Journey
 Podcast: LA Auto Show, Chrysler Designer Ryan Nagode (podcast #132)

People in the automobile industry
American automobile designers
Living people
Year of birth missing (living people)